is a railway station located in the city of Kitakami, Iwate Prefecture, Japan, operated by the East Japan Railway Company (JR East).

Lines
Tatekawame Station is served by the Kitakami Line, and is located 12.1 km from the terminus of the line at Kitakami Station.

Station layout
The station has ine side platform serving traffic in both directions. The station is unattended.

History
Tatekawame Station opened on May 15, 1963. The station was absorbed into the JR East network upon the privatization of the Japan National Railways (JNR) on April 1, 1987.

Surrounding area

See also
 List of railway stations in Japan

References

External links

 

Railway stations in Iwate Prefecture
Kitakami Line
Railway stations in Japan opened in 1963
Kitakami, Iwate
Stations of East Japan Railway Company